Moin-moin or moimoi is a steamed  or boiled bean pudding made from a mixture of washed and peeled black-eyed beans, often combined with onions and fresh ground red peppers (usually a combination of bell peppers, chili or Scotch bonnet), spices and fish/egg/crayfish. Its a protein-rich food that originated and is a staple from Nigeria. Moi moi is traditionally steamed in a special leaf called Ewe eran, though it can also be steamed in other materials like steaming containers.

Asides from its name moi moi, it is also commonly known as "alele" or "olele", all three from the Yoruba language, but is more commonly known by latter in Sierra Leone and Ghana. It is usually taken with Ogi /Akamu/koko. It can also be taken with garri, pap, or custard. Moi moi is now usually used as a side dish in Nigerian parties, served alongside Jollof rice and other dishes.

Preparation 
Moin-moin is prepared by first soaking the beans in cold water until they are soft enough to remove the fine outer covering or peel. Then they are ground or blended (using a blender) until a fine paste is achieved.  Salt, bouillon cube, dried crayfish, vegetable oil (or any edible oil such as palm oil) and other seasonings are added to taste.  Some add sardines, corned beef, sliced boiled eggs, or a combination of these and other 'garnishes' to liven up Moin-Moin.  Such is referred to as having 'x' number of lives, 'x' representing the number of garnishes added.  The most touted is Moin-Moin elemi meje, which translates to Moin-Moin with seven lives.

Moin-moin usually comes in a slanted pyramid shape, cylindrical shape, cone shape and any targeted shape owing to the mold it is poured into prior to cooking.  The pyramid shape comes from the traditional broad "ewe eran" (Thaumatococcus daniellii) or banana leaves fashioned into a cone in one's palm, then the seasoned and garnished liquid is poured into the leaves, which is then folded.  The cylindrical shapes come from empty cans of milk or tomato sauce used in preparation of other dishes.  After packaging, it is placed in a large pot about a tenth filled with water.  The water is the source of steam that cooks the moin-moin.  Moin-moin is eaten alone or with bread as a snack, with rice as a meal or with ogi  for breakfast or supper. It can also be taken with garri in the afternoon. The moin-moin process has been made easy by blending beans into flour also called beans flour, this flour process as eliminates the stress of peeling beans and washing them multiple times. 
All that is needed is to mix the bean flour with water, add seasonings and salt to taste, fish, stocks, pawns, etc.

See also

 Akara
 Okpa
 List of African dishes
 List of steamed foods

References

External links
 How Afrolems makes Moin-Moin
 Moimoin recipe
 https://tspace.library.utoronto.ca/bitstream/1807/6705/1/jb06075.pdf

Cameroonian cuisine
Igbo cuisine
Nigerian cuisine
Puddings
Steamed foods
Yoruba cuisine